Véretz is a commune in the Indre-et-Loire department in central France. The anarchist poet and chansonnier Eugène Bizeau (1883–1989) was born in Véretz.

Population

See also
Communes of the Indre-et-Loire department

References

Communes of Indre-et-Loire